The enzyme acyl-CoA hydrolase (EC 3.1.2.20) catalyzes the reaction

acyl-CoA + H2O  CoA + a carboxylate

This enzyme belongs to the family of hydrolases, specifically those acting on thioester bonds.  The systematic name of this enzyme class is acyl-CoA hydrolase. Other names in common use include acyl coenzyme A thioesterase, acyl-CoA thioesterase, acyl coenzyme A hydrolase, thioesterase B, thioesterase II, and acyl-CoA thioesterase.

Structural studies

References

 

EC 3.1.2
Enzymes of known structure